Franz-Josef Rehrl  (born 15 March 1993) is an Austrian nordic combined skier who competes internationally.

He competed at the 2018 and 2022 Winter Olympics.

His first podium in an World Cup race came on 30 November 2018, when he finished third at Lillehammer. His first win came in the same season, in Chaux-Neuve.

Record

World Championship

World Cup wins

References

External links

1993 births
Living people
Austrian male Nordic combined skiers
Olympic Nordic combined skiers of Austria
Nordic combined skiers at the 2018 Winter Olympics
Nordic combined skiers at the 2022 Winter Olympics
People from Liezen District
FIS Nordic World Ski Championships medalists in Nordic combined
Sportspeople from Styria